The Pakistan Veterinary Medical Council (abbreviated as PVMC) is a statutory regulatory body for accreditation of veterinary education and registration of veterinary practitioners in Pakistan. It was established in 1999  under the Pakistan Veterinary Medical Council Act 1996. Its headquarters is located in Islamabad.

See also
 Faculty of Animal Husbandry and Veterinary Sciences (AHVS), Tandojam, Sindh
 University of Veterinary and Animal Sciences, Lahore
 Cholistan University of Veterinary and Animal Sciences, Bahawalpur
 University of Veterinary and Animal Sciences (Ravi Campus), Pattoki

References

External links
 PVMC official website

Pakistan federal departments and agencies
Professional associations based in Pakistan
1999 establishments in Pakistan
Government agencies established in 1999
Veterinary organizations
Organizations established in 1999
Veterinary medicine in Pakistan